Ilex ternatiflora is a possibly extinct plant in the family Aquifoliaceae. It was endemic to Cuba.

References

Extinct plants
ternatiflora
Endemic flora of Cuba
Taxonomy articles created by Polbot